Bezanson can refer to:

Places
Bezanson, Alberta, a hamlet in Alberta, Canada

People
 Jeff Bezanson, an American computer scientist
 Keith Bezanson, a Canadian diplomat
 Philip Bezanson, an American composer
 Thomas Bezanson, a Canadian artist